Harry Reginald Lloyd (9 July 1899 – 23 May 1976) was an Australian rules footballer who played with Collingwood in the Victorian Football League (VFL).

Notes

External links 
		
Reg Lloyd's profile at Collingwood Forever

1899 births
1976 deaths
Australian rules footballers from Victoria (Australia)
Collingwood Football Club players